The William Pinto House, also known as William Pinto-Eli Whitney House, is a historic house at 275 Orange Street in New Haven, Connecticut. It is a Federal-style building of post-and-beam construction, and was built in 1810 for John Cook, a merchant.  It is rare and unusual for its design, which places the gable end facing the street, rather than to the side as was more typical in the Federal period.  It is historically notable for its second owner, William Pinto, a member of one of New Haven's leading Jewish families, and for its third occupant, Eli Whitney, who leased the house from Pinto in the later years of his life.  The house was listed on the National Register of Historic Places in 1985.  It now houses professional offices.

Description and history
The William Pinto House is located a short way east of the New Haven Green in central New Haven, on the east side of Orange Street between Elm and Wall Streets.  It is a -story wood rame structure, with a gabled roof and clapboarded exterior.  Its street-facing facade is three bays wide, with the main entrance in the rightmost bay.  Sash windows occupy the other bays, and are topped by corniced lintels.  There is a small Palladian window in the gable end above.  The entrance is flanked by pilasters and topped by a half-round transom, and is sheltered by a gabled hood with elongated carved brackets.  The interior retains main finishes including fireplace surrounds and trim.

When this house was built in 1810, Orange Street was a fashionable upper-class residential area; it has since been transformed into a largely commercial district of the city's downtown.  It was built for John Cook, a prominent local merchant, who sold it in 1812 to William Pinto, a member of one of the first Jewish families to settled in New Haven.  Pinto served in the state militia during the American Revolutionary War, and was one of its most successful West Indies merchants.  Pinto rented the house to inventor Eli Whitney in 1819, which he occupied until his death in 1825.  Architecturally, the house is a rare surviving example of a Federal style house with a front-facing gable.

Gallery

See also
National Register of Historic Places listings in New Haven, Connecticut

References

Houses on the National Register of Historic Places in Connecticut
Federal architecture in Connecticut
Houses completed in 1810
Houses in New Haven, Connecticut
National Register of Historic Places in New Haven, Connecticut